Trichosacme is a species of plants in the Apocynaceae first described as a genus in 1846. It contains only one known species, Trichosacme lanata, native to Mexico.

References

Flora of Mexico
Monotypic Apocynaceae genera